Latson is a surname. Notable people with the surname include:

 T. L. Latson (born 1970s), American basketball player
 W. R. C. Latson (1866–1911), American physician
 Reginald Latson, also known as Neli Latson, autistic American man who was arrested in 2010 and later pardoned